Radiation effects may refer to:

 Radiation damage on physical objects due to ionizing radiation
 Radiation exposure, a measure of the ionization of air due to ionizing radiation from photons
 Radiation-induced cancer, exposure to ionizing radiation is known to increase the future incidence of cancer, particularly leukemia
 Acute radiation syndrome, a collection of health effects that are caused by being exposed to high amounts of ionizing radiation in a short period of time
 Radiobiology, the effect on living things from ionizing radiation
 Radiation Effects and Defects in Solids, an academic journal formerly known as Radiation Effects

See also 
 Radiation poisoning (disambiguation)